Vicente de Azcuénaga Iturbe (January 1706–1787) was a Spanish-born Argentine businessman and politician.

From Durango, Vizcaya, Spain, he arrived in Buenos Aires in his early forties and was devoted to commercial activities. He proved to be a successful trader which enabled him to amass a small fortune in a short time. He maintained a strong friendship with Francisco Ugarte, another great merchant of the time.

In Argentina Azcuénaga was also treated as a Spanish noble. He was elected Mayor of the Town of Buenos Aires in 1759. In 1760, he was appointed ruler of the Cabildo. In 1774 he was appointed Trustee of Commerce of San Francisco.

He married María Rosa de Basavilbaso y Urtubia (daughter of Domingo de Basavilbaso) on August 30, 1752. Vincent de Azcuénaga had seven children, three of whom spent time in the Argentine military, while another was an attorney.

References
Osvaldo Vicente Cutolo, Nuevo Diccionario Biográfico Argentino

1706 births
1787 deaths
People from Durango, Biscay
18th-century Argentine people
Argentine businesspeople
Mayors of Buenos Aires
18th-century Spanish businesspeople
Río de la Plata